James Gillan may refer to:
James Angus Gillan (1885–1981), Scottish rower
James Gillan (actor) (born 1975), Scottish actor
Jamie Gillan (born 1997), American football player from Scotland
Jim Gillan, Australian politician, see Candidates of the Australian federal election, 1993 and Electoral results for the Division of Ryan